Devereaux Peters (born October 8, 1989) is an American basketball forward with WBC Dynamo Novosibirsk of the Russian women's league.

Career
Peters played at Notre Dame, where she was Big East Conference Defensive Player of the Year in 2012. She led a Notre Dame squad that finished second in the 2012 NCAA women's basketball tournament.

Peters made her WNBA debut on May 20, 2012, with the Minnesota Lynx, scoring 3 points and grabbing 4 rebounds in a win over the Phoenix Mercury.

Peters quickly became the first power forward off the bench, and led the team in field goal percentage through sixteen games. In July, Peters broke a finger on her left hand, forcing her to miss three games.

Peters would remain the primary backup in 2013, leading the Lynx in blocked shots. She played a key role in the Lynx's second WNBA championship, serving as a reliable defensive presence.

On February 2, 2016, Peters was traded to the Indiana Fever in exchange for Natasha Howard.

On February 5, 2018, Peters signed a contract with the Washington Mystics.

USA Basketball
Peters played on the team presenting the US at the 2011 World University Games held in Shenzhen, China. The team, coached by Bill Fennelly, won all six games to earn the gold medal. Peters averaged 10.0 points and 5.3 rebounds per game.

WNBA career statistics

Regular season

|-
| align="left" | 2012
| align="left" | Minnesota
| 30 || 2 || 14.1 || .560 || .000 || .706 || 3.8 || 1.1 || 0.5 || 0.8 || 1.3 || 5.3
|-
|style="text-align:left;background:#afe6ba;"| 2013†
| align="left" | Minnesota
| 34 || 2 || 18.6 || .396 || .000 || .852 || 4.6 || 1.1 || 0.7 || 1.0 || 0.9 || 4.1
|-
| align="left" | 2014
| align="left" | Minnesota
| 28 || 0 || 18.0 || .443 || .000 || .737 || 3.7 || 1.7 || 0.8 || 1.0 || 1.1 || 4.4
|-
|style="text-align:left;background:#afe6ba;"| 2015†
| align="left" | Minnesota
| 33 || 0 || 14.6 || .449 || .375 || .867 || 3.4 || 0.8 || 0.2 || 0.9 || 0.9 || 3.2
|-
| align="left" | 2016
| align="left" | Indiana
| 30 || 0 || 14.7 || .549 || .333 || .556 || 3.0 || 0.7 || 0.4 || 0.6 || 0.6 || 5.2
|-
| align="left" | 2017
| align="left" | Phoenix
| 5 || 0 || 7.6 || .333 || .000 || .000 || 1.6 || 0.4 || 0.0 || 0.0 || 0.4 || 1.6
|-
| align="left" | Career
| align="left" | 6 years, 3 teams
| 160 || 4 || 15.7 || .474 || .308 || .738 || 3.6 || 1.1 || 0.5 || 0.8 || 0.9 || 4.3

Playoffs

|-
| align="left" | 2012
| align="left" | Minnesota
| 9 || 0 || 6.9 || .417 || .000 || .667 || 1.8 || 0.3 || 0.4 || 0.6 || 0.7 || 1.3
|-
|style="text-align:left;background:#afe6ba;"| 2013†
| align="left" | Minnesota
| 7 || 0 || 16.6 || .542 || .000 || .500 || 3.6 || 1.0 || 1.0 || 1.0 || 0.9 || 3.9
|-
| align="left" | 2014
| align="left" | Minnesota
| 5 || 0 || 11.4 || .455 || .000 || .000 || 2.2 || 0.2 || 0.6 || 0.2 || 1.2 || 2.0
|-
|style="text-align:left;background:#afe6ba;"| 2015†
| align="left" | Minnesota
| 10 || 0 || 13.9 || .531 || .000 || 1.000 || 2.2 || 0.9 || 0.5 || 0.8 || 0.7 || 4.0
|-
| align="left" | 2017
| align="left" | Phoenix
| 2 || 0 || 6.5 || .250 || .000 || .000 || 1.0 || 0.0 || 0.5 || 0.5 || 0.5 || 1.0
|-
| align="left" | Career
| align="left" | 5 years, 2 teams
| 33 || 0 || 11.7 || .494 || .000 || .818 || 2.3 || 0.6 || 0.6 || 0.7 || 0.8 || 2.8

College statistics
Source

References

1989 births
Living people
American expatriate basketball people in Italy
American expatriate basketball people in Poland
American expatriate basketball people in Russia
American women's basketball players
Basketball players from Chicago
Forwards (basketball)
Indiana Fever players
McDonald's High School All-Americans
Medalists at the 2011 Summer Universiade
Minnesota Lynx draft picks
Minnesota Lynx players
Notre Dame Fighting Irish women's basketball players
Parade High School All-Americans (girls' basketball)
Universiade gold medalists for the United States
Universiade medalists in basketball